Anoecia krizusi is a species of aphid in the subfamily Anoeciinae. It has been recorded as a millet pest.

References

Aphididae
Insect pests of millets